is a music party video game developed and published by Nintendo for the Wii console. The game was released in Japan on 19 January 2012, but was never released outside of Japan. In June 2017, the game was digitally re-released in Japan via the Nintendo eShop on Wii U.

Gameplay
The gameplay of Kiki Trick involves listening to a sentence with garbled speech. The player must then choose a word out of a list that completes the sentence. Players can have the sentence repeated.

The game features audio-based minigames.

Development
Yoshio Sakamoto was responsible for designing the game, with Noriyuki Sato directing the game. Sato was previously the team leader on an earlier Nintendo SPD project, the Nintendo DS Digital TV Tuner. The game is based on a proprietary technology designed by Otodesigners Co. Ltd, a Japanese sound engineering company with roots in developing hearing aids and other types of sound technology.

Legacy 
Noise, the host of Kiki Trick, has a cameo appearance in Super Smash Bros. Ultimate as a spirit.

References

Notes

External links

2012 video games
Japan-exclusive video games
Multiplayer and single-player video games
Music video games
Nintendo games
Party video games
Video games developed in Japan
Wii games
Wii games re-released on the Nintendo eShop
Word puzzle video games